The Institute for Clinical and Economic Review (ICER) is a Boston-based independent nonprofit organization that seeks to place a value on medical care by providing comprehensive clinical and cost-effectiveness analyses of treatments, tests, and procedures.

It was founded in about 2005 by physician-researcher Steven D. Pearson, MD, MSc, FRCP. Until 2014 it concentrated on assessing health care costs (rather than evaluating drugs). It evaluates the cost effectiveness of drugs in a similar way to the UK's NICE, and has come under some criticism from the drug industry. ICER has placed a monetary value on a number of prescription drugs since 2014. Those evaluations have been used by insurers to justify which drugs are approved or denied. 
The institution is funded by Arnold Ventures LLC (formerly the Laura and John Arnold Foundation), drug makers, insurers, and government grants.

Threshold cost criteria
ICER uses a “value assessment framework” to decide prices for select medical treatments. The framework was last adjusted in 2020. ICER’s framework considers total spending on medical treatments as well as the type of patient who will receive the treatment.

To find total spending, ICER estimates the amount of money available to be spent annually on new drugs and then divides that amount by the number of expected US Food and Drug Administration approvals to set an affordability benchmark.

To determine patient value, ICER uses quality-adjusted life year (QALY) to determine how much a drug can improve the quality of the patient’s life. QALYs determine how much a treatment can improve a patient’s life while subtracting value for any negative side effects.  ICER also uses the Equal Value of Life Years Gained (evLYG) to determine if treatment adds years to the patient’s life.

ICER's affordability calculations adjust for drugs targeting prevalent diseases and/or those presenting a significant clinical benefit by setting the threshold at double the available funds divided by the expected number of new drugs (approved by FDA).

After discussions in 2016 ICER determined the value of one quality-adjusted life year threshold to be $150,000.

Criticism
Since drugs that combat rarer diseases are typically spread over smaller patient pools, companies will often charge a higher price for the drug in order to recoup their investment. As a result, some critics argue ICER tends to report that these rare disease drugs are not worth the high cost listed for them, without taking into account the input of physicians, patients, or other societal factors when determining a drug’s value.  According to the Pioneer Institute, “A recent ICER review of two breakthrough treatments for Spinal Muscular Atrophy (SMA) concluded that neither therapy met ‘traditional cost-effectiveness thresholds.’”

ICER has been criticized for being an “arbitrary, nontransparent, non-peer-reviewed report” which can determine whether a patient receives a treatment recommended by a doctor.

ICER’s use of the QALY has left some concerned that less efficient drugs will be prioritized. Oxford University’s Quarterly Journal of Medicine stated: “If a new treatment is less effective than standard therapy, but costs much less there will be a cost per QALY benefit in adopting it.” 

ICER is also seen as a watchdog for drug price hikes that are not backed by clinical evidence. ICER released a study in 2019 that reported, “In 2017 and 2018, out of nine identified drugs that had substantial price increases on top of already high current spending, seven drugs had no new important evidence to support their price increases. The net price increases on these seven drugs alone cost American insurers and patients an additional $4.8 billion over two years.”

QALY 
QALY stands for Quality-Adjusted Life Year and it is one measurement system used by ICER to determine the value of a drug. One QALY is equal to one perfect year of health. Critics of the QALY argue that the measurement is too subjective to be used broadly. Critics also claim QALYs can be ableist or ageist because disabled or elderly individuals cannot have one year of perfect health based on its criteria.Proponents of the system agree that it may be imperfect, but consider it to be the best available measurement system for quality and quantity of life.

Drugs evaluated - reports issued
It issued a draft report that said Sovaldi wasn’t worth the list price of about $84,000 a year.

As of May 2016 ICER published final reports on

- Multiple myeloma
- Palliative care

 

It has criticized the high price of drugs for osteoporosis, multiple sclerosis, PCSK9 cholesterol meds, and immuno-oncology therapies.

In 2017 it issued a controversial draft report on PARP inhibitors for ovarian cancer.

Drug evaluations planned
A preliminary list of drugs to be evaluated includes rociletinib, AZD-9291, necitumumab, nivolumab, and pembrolizumab for small-cell lung cancer; fingolimod, dimethyl fumarate, teriflunomide, alemtuzumab, and daclizumab for multiple sclerosis; and ixekizumab and brodalumab for psoriasis or psoriatic arthritis.

Advisory and Governance Boards
ICER's governing boards include various health experts, including several insurance executives.

Governance Board:
Ellen Andrews, PhD, Executive Director, Connecticut Health Policy Project
Carmella Bocchino, RN, MBA, President and CEO, CRB Strategies, LLC
Wendy Everett, ScD, Special Advisor, NEHI
Ron Pollack, JD, Chair Emeritus, Families USA
Murray Ross, PhD (Chair), Vice President and Director, Kaiser Institute for Health Policy Kaiser Permanente
Lewis Sandy, MD, Executive Vice President, Clinical Advancement, UnitedHealth Group
Mark Skinner, JD, President and CEO, Institute for Policy Advancement
Anya Rader Wallack, PhD, Associate Director, Center for Evidence Synthesis in Health at Brown University

Advisory Board:
Robert W. Dubois, MD, PhD, Chief Science Officer, National Pharmaceutical Council
Jon Gavras, MD, Senior Vice President, Chief Medical Officer, Prime Therapeutics
Colleen Haines, RPh, Chief Clinical Officer, IngenioRx, a subsidiary of Anthem
Vivian Herrera, Executive Director, Head Immunology & Dermatology and Medical Access, US Health Economics & Outcomes Research, Novartis Pharmaceuticals Corporation
Kjel A. Johnson, PharmD, Vice President, Specialty Strategy and Client Solutions, CVS Health
Ron Preblick, PharmD, MPH, Sr. Director, Global Business Partner, Rare Blood Disorders, Sanofi
Andreas Kuznik, Senior Director, Health Economics and Outcomes Research, Regeneron Pharmaceuticals
Chris Leibman, PharmD, Senior Vice President, Value and Access, Biogen
Dave Macarios, MBA, MSc, Vice President, Global Evidence and Value Development, Allergan
Martin Marciniak, PhD, Vice President, US Medical Affairs, Customer Engagement, Value, Evidence, and Outcomes, GlaxoSmithKline
Kendra Martello, JD, Senior Director, Public Policy, Government Affairs & Public Policy, Mallinckrodt Pharmaceuticals
Michael Sherman, MD, MBA, MS, Senior Vice President and Chief Medical Officer, Harvard Pilgrim Health Care
David R. Strutton, PhD, MPH, Vice President, Global Pharmaceuticals and Policy Evidence Research, Center for Observational and Real-World Evidence (CORE), Merck & Co., Inc.
Sean D. Sullivan, PhD, MSc, Professor and Dean, University of Washington School of Pharmacy
Marcus Thygeson, MD, Chief Health Officer, Bind Benefits
John Watkins, PharmD, MPH, BCPS, Pharmacy Manager, Formulary Development, Premera Blue Cross
David Weinstock, MD, Professor of Medicine and Pediatrics, Harvard Medical School and Dana-Farber Cancer Institute

See also
 Academy of Managed Care Pharmacy, an older US organisation that evaluates drug cost effectiveness

References

External links
 ICER website

Organizations established in 2005
Medical and health organizations based in Massachusetts
Health care management